North Woodbury is an unincorporated community in Morrow County, in the U.S. state of Ohio.

History
North Woodbury was platted in 1830. The post office at North Woodbury was called Woodview. This post office was established in 1843, and remained in operation until 1902.

References

Unincorporated communities in Morrow County, Ohio
1830 establishments in Ohio
Populated places established in 1830
Unincorporated communities in Ohio